HD Vest, Inc. is an American financial services firm, which offers tax and other financial planning consultations to its  customers. Founded in 1983 as "HD Vest Investment Securities, Inc.", the company now operates under the name "HD Vest Financial Services".

History
HD Vest was founded by Herbie Darwin Vest in 1983. Herb Vest, a Certified Public Accountant, had started his own public accounting firm in 1973. He started offering investment planning services and selling of securities on a commission basis in 1979. In 1983, he established the SEC-registered securities broker-dealer firm HD Vest Investment Securities, Inc. He established a network of accountant and brokers. HD Vest successfully challenged the AICPA code, which prohibited accountants from accepting commissions.

In December 1986, Herb Vest established "HD Vest, Inc.", which acquired the HD Vest Investment Securities, Inc." in 1987. The company went public in July 1988. At the end of 1991, it reported a revenue of $20 million, and a profit of around $922,000. The revenues grew above $35 million in 1992, but the company lost around $3.2 million.

In 1992, HD Vest adopted cost-cutting measures and started focusing more on training. The company's revenues grew to $46 million in 1993, while the profit increased to $3 million. In the mid-1990s, the company's started shifting from commission-based sales to fee-based portfolio advisory services. After posting a loss in 1994, it gradually improved and reported revenues above $100 million in 1998.

In 1999, Herb Vest was declared as "Entrepreneur of The Year" by Ernst & Young. In 2000, as a marketing effort, HD Vest started offering free online tax return preparation. It reported that 260,000 taxpayers had filed their returns using the free service in 2000. In 2000, it launched the MyHDVEST.com portal for its customers. It also partnered with CompuBank and National Financial Services Corporation to offer online banking services integrated with its own services. Its revenues increased from $150.2 million in 1999 to $193.8 million in 2000.

HD Vest was acquired by Wells Fargo in 2001 for $127.5 million. Herb Vest stepped down as the company's top executive, and was replaced by Roger Ochs. Wells Fargo sold the HD Vest Financial Services brokerage and tax-advisory unit to the private-equity firm Parthenon Capital Partners in 2011.

In August 2013, HD Vest Financial Services re-branded as HD Vest Financial Services and updated their logo and color palette. On 14 October 2015, Bellevue, WA-based company Blucora announced that it will acquire HD Vest for approximately $580 million.

HD Vest was rebranded as Avantax Wealth Management in 2019.

After leaving HD Vest Financial Services, Herb Vest founded the controversial online dating service True, which was active from 2003 to 2013.

References

Financial services companies established in 1983
Companies based in Irving, Texas
Financial services companies of the United States